Anthony Carl Lomas (born 10 May 1943) is a British former motorcycle speedway rider.

Biography
Born in Coventry, Lomas took up speedway at a Coventry training school in 1967 and after being signed by Coventry Bees was loaned out to Weymouth Eagles in Division Two of the British League in 1968, also riding for his parent club in one league match that year. He averaged over 9 points in his first season, in which he also finished eighth in the Second Division Riders Championship, and in 1969, riding for Long Eaton Rangers, his average rose to almost 10.5 in division two and over 4.7 for Coventry in division one. By 1971 he had improved further and made his debut for England against Scotland, and for the British Lions against Australia, and was also reserve in the World Final. In 1972 he averaged over 8 points per match for Coventry and rode in further test matches for England. In 1973 he left Coventry, riding for Oxford Rebels before moving on to Exeter Falcons and riding in the championship-winning team of 1974. In 1975 he signed for Leicester Lions where he spent two seasons, but with his level of performance dropping, he dropped down to the National League in 1978 with Stoke Potters. He rode for Stoke again in 1979, retiring before the season ended.

World Final appearances

Individual World Championship
 1971 -  Göteborg, Ullevi - Reserve - Did not ride

References

1945 births
Living people
British speedway riders
English motorcycle racers
Sportspeople from Rugby, Warwickshire
Weymouth Wildcats riders
Coventry Bees riders
Oxford Cheetahs riders
Exeter Falcons riders
Stoke Potters riders
Leicester Lions riders